West End is a Roanoke, Virginia neighborhood located in central Roanoke south of the Norfolk Southern railyard. It borders the neighborhoods of Hurt Park and Mountain View on the west, Downtown on the east, Gilmer  on the north across the Norfolk Southern railyard and Old Southwest on the south.

History 
Originally residential in character, today the area is dominated by commercial and industrial uses. Today the area is the location of the West End Park.

References

External links
 Hurt Park/Mountain View/West End Neighborhood Plan

Neighborhoods in Roanoke, Virginia